Reinhardt Hamman (born 20 February 1990) is a Paralympian Track and field athlete from South Africa competing mainly in category F38 throwing events.

Athletics career
Hamman took up athletics at the age of 13 at Vista Nova Primary School in Rondebosch. In 2009 he quit the sport following his disappointment at not qualifying for the 2008 Summer Paralympics in Beijing. He returned to the sport in 2013, and was selected for the South African team o compete at the 2013 IPC Athletics World Championships in Lyon. He took part in the javelin throw and shot put, finishing fifth in the shot, but threw a distance of 45.72 metres in the javelin to take the gold medal. Two years later he competed at the 2015 World Championships in Doha, winning gold in the javelin and silver in the shot put.

Personal history
Hamman was born in Cape Town, South Africa in 1990. He has cerebral palsy.

References

Living people
1990 births
South African male javelin throwers
South African male shot putters
Sportspeople from Cape Town
Paralympic gold medalists for South Africa
Medalists at the 2016 Summer Paralympics
Athletes (track and field) at the 2016 Summer Paralympics
Commonwealth Games medallists in athletics
Commonwealth Games bronze medallists for South Africa
Athletes (track and field) at the 2018 Commonwealth Games
Paralympic medalists in athletics (track and field)
Paralympic athletes of South Africa
Athletes (track and field) at the 2020 Summer Paralympics
Medallists at the 2018 Commonwealth Games